Papa Little (Old Norse: Papey Litla, meaning "the little island of the priests") is an island in St Magnus Bay, Shetland, Scotland.

The island lies at the head of Aith Voe in north west Mainland, Shetland, south of Muckle Roe. It is largely peat-covered and has been uninhabited since the 1840s.

Its name means "little island of the papar" (as distinct from Papa Stour), who were Gaelic hermits or Culdees found as far north as Iceland.

Notable people
Elizabeth Balfour (midwife) (1832-1918)

Footnotes

Uninhabited islands of Shetland
Former populated places in Scotland